Berkeleytrione is a bio-active fungal isolate from the Berkeley Pit.

References 

Triketones
Methyl esters